"Single Man" is a song recorded by Canadian country group High Valley. The song was written by the group's frontman Brad Rempel along with Jordan Schmidt and Derrick Southerland.

Background
Both Rempel brothers of High Valley are married and have kids with their wives, and they elected to use a play-on-words with the sing title. Rather than singing about being a "single man", the song is the narrator singing about how they don't know a single man who wouldn't want what he has. Brad Rempel, who co-wrote the track, said he "loved how it talked about how sometimes, being single looks amazing but it never can beat what we have at home with our family".

Critical reception
Billy Dukes of Taste of Country said the song "feels like something you'd keep time with around the campfire", adding that High Valley "[doubles] down on the foot-stomping, rootsy sound they've softly been introducing to mainstream country music crowds in the United States. Nicole Bochinis of NY Country Swag called the track "upbeat", saying "the future is looking very bright" for the group.

Commercial performance
"Single Man" reached a peak of number two on the Billboard Canada Country chart, marking the group's sixth top five hit. It also peaked at number 81 on the Billboard Canadian Hot 100, their highest charting entry there since "Come On Down" in 2015. The track was certified Platinum by Music Canada.

Music video
The official music video for "Single Man" was filmed on a ranch outside Nashville, Tennessee, and features a man doing his best to be a good husband and father. It was directed by Sean Hagwell and premiered on May 1, 2019.

Track listings
Digital download – single
 "Single Man" – 3:26

Digital download – single
 "Single Man" (acoustic version) – 3:19

Digital download – single
 "Single Man" (bluegrass version) – 3:51

Charts

Certifications

References

2019 songs
2019 singles
High Valley songs
Atlantic Records singles
Warner Music Group singles
Songs written by Brad Rempel
Songs written by Jordan Schmidt